YWP may refer to:

 Yorkshire Wildlife Park, a wildlife park and tourist attraction in Branton, South Yorkshire, England
 YWP, the IATA code for Webequie Airport, Ontario, Canada